Anthonie Potgieter (born 26 December 1958) is a South African cricketer. He played in two first-class matches for Boland in 1980/81.

See also
 List of Boland representative cricketers

References

External links
 

1958 births
Living people
South African cricketers
Boland cricketers
Cricketers from Kimberley, Northern Cape